The University of Bedfordshire Theatre is a theatre situated on  the Polhill Campus of the University of Bedfordshire, Bedford, Bedfordshire, England.

The venue
The venue serves the population of Bedford. The 280-seat arena stage theatre is one of the largest in Bedfordshire.

The University of Bedfordshire owns and operates the theatre, which is located within the Bedford Campus of the university. During term time, the venue is used as a lecture hall on weekdays but is available for independent use on evenings, weekends, and holidays. The theatre hosts a variety of plays and performances from groups such as the "Full House Theatre Company."

See also
 University of Bedfordshire
 Bedford Civic Theatre

References

Theatres in Bedfordshire
University of Bedfordshire
Buildings and structures in Bedford